The 7th IAAF World Half Marathon Championships was held on September 27, 1998, in the city of Uster, Switzerland. A total of 236 athletes, 139 men and 97 women, from 54 countries took part.

Detailed reports on the event and an appraisal of the results was given.

Complete results were published.

Medallists

Race Results

Men's

Women's

Team Results

Men's

Women's

Participation
The participation of 236 athletes (139 men/97 women) from 54 countries is reported.

 (1)
 (1)
 (5)
 (1)
 (5)
 (1)
 (2)
 (6)
 (5)
 (7)
 (3)
 (2)
 (3)
 (10)
 (2)
 (10)
 (9)
 (2)
 (1)
 (1)
 (5)
 (1)
 (10)
 (9)
 (10)
 (2)
 (3)
 (1)
 (1)
 (5)
 (1)
 (3)
 (1)
 (5)
 (6)
 (4)
 (8)
 (5)
 (4)
 (3)
 (2)
 (9)
 (8)
 (1)
 (1)
 (10)
 (3)
 (4)
 (4)
 (5)
 (10)
 (6)
 (6)
 (3)

See also
1998 in athletics (track and field)

References

External links
Official website

IAAF World Half Marathon Championships
Half Marathon Championships
World Athletics Half Marathon Championships
International athletics competitions hosted by Switzerland